Marconiphone was an English manufacturer of domestic receiving equipment, notably radio receivers and reel-to-reel tape machines.

Early History 

After World War I, the Marconi Company began producing non-industrial receivers, principally for the amateur market, at the Soho premises of The Marconi Scientific Instrument Company. In 1922, the Marconi Company formed the "Marconiphone" department, to design, manufacture and sell domestic receiving equipment. This equipment complied with Post Office specifications and tests, and was therefore awarded the BBC authorisation stamp; initially sets were made at the Chelmsford Works. In December 1923, the 'Marconiphone' department was formed as a subsidiary of the Marconi Company. Some Marconiphone Company sets were made at the Sterling Telephone Company (STC) Works at Dagenham. However, design and research of these domestic receivers still continued at Chelmsford.

Gramophone Company 

In December 1929, the Marconiphone was sold to the Gramophone Company, along with the right to use the trademark "Marconiphone" and the copyright signature "G. Marconi" on domestic receivers. The Marconi Company never re-entered the domestic radio market. In 1931 the Gramophone Company became Electric and Musical Industries (EMI) and produced domestic and radio receivers using the Marconiphone trademark until 1956, when receivers were made by the British Radio Corporation, under licence. Domestic receivers bearing the Marconiphone trademark produced after 1929 had no connection with the Marconi Company.

In 1936, the Marconiphone company moved into the production of cathode ray tubes and television receivers and in 1953 they were still manufacturing television sets.

In the 1950s HMV and Marconiphone were taken over by Thorn and the products of the two companies became extremely similar.

Mobile telephones 

The Marconiphone brand was revived in the late 1980s and used by a division of GEC-Marconi for mobile phones.  Phones made by companies such as NEC were given and additional small rectangular metal plate with the Marconiphone logo.

Marconi acted as a service provider for Cellnet and Vodafone in the UK before selling the customer base to Mercury in 1991.

See also 
HMV Radios

References 

Guglielmo Marconi
Defunct manufacturing companies of the United Kingdom
Electronics companies of the United Kingdom
Radio manufacturers